Maxilly-sur-Saône is a commune in the Côte-d'Or department in the Bourgogne-Franche-Comté region in eastern France.

Geography 
Located a few kilometers from the Haute-Saône, Maxilly-sur-Saône is crossed by the canal from the Marne to the Saône.

The inhabitants are called Maximilliens and Maximilliennes.

Bordering municipalities

Town planning

Typology 
Maxilly-sur-Saône is a rural municipality, because it is part of the municipalities with little or very little density, within the meaning of the municipal density grid of Insee.

In addition, the municipality is part of the attraction area of Dijon, of which it is a municipality in the crown. This area, which includes 333 municipalities, is categorized in areas of 200,000 to less than 700,000 inhabitants.

The zoning of the municipality, as reflected in the database European occupation biophysical soil Corine Land Cover (CLC), is marked by the importance of the agricultural land (59.6% in 2018), a proportion roughly equivalent to that of 1990 (59.1%). The detailed breakdown in 2018 is as follows:

 forests (30.7%)
 meadows (29%)
 arable land (18.2%)
 heterogeneous agricultural areas (12.4%)
 urbanized areas (7.1%)
 inland waters (2.3%)
 industrial or commercial zones and communication networks (0.5%).

The IGN also provides an online tool to compare the evolution over time of land use in the municipality (or in territories at different scales). Several eras are accessible as aerial maps or photos: the Cassini map (18th century), the map of Staff (1820-1866) and the current period (1950 to present).

Places and monuments 

 Lock where the canal from the Marne to the Saône ends (or begins).
 Saint-Martin Parish church.

Population

See also
Communes of the Côte-d'Or department

References

Communes of Côte-d'Or